WGRI (1050 AM) is a commercial radio station broadcasting an urban gospel radio format.  It is licensed to Cincinnati, Ohio, and is owned by the Christian Broadcasting System, Ltd. (not related to the Christian Broadcasting Network).  The studios and offices are on West 7th Street in Cincinnati.

By day, WGRI is powered at 1,000 watts non-directional.  But because 1050 AM is a Mexican clear channel frequency, WGRI must reduce power at night to 279 watts to avoid causing interference.  The transmitter is near Interstate 71 in Covington, Kentucky, where the station was originally established and broadcast until 1960.  Programming is also heard on 75-watt FM translator W276DD at 103.1 MHz.

History

WZIP in Covington
Northern Kentucky Airwaves Corporation filed on February 4, 1946, for a new radio station on 1050 kilocycles to be operated at Covington, Kentucky.  It was granted a construction permit from the Federal Communications Commission on May 29, 1947. In being granted the application, Northern Kentucky Airwaves, headed by Arthur Eilerman, prevailed over Northern Kentucky Radio, led by Arthur's brother, B.J. Eilerman.  One witness at the hearing said the services proposed by both were "as like as peas in a pod". Taking the call sign WZIP, the station proceeded with construction.  Before signing on, however, it lost its planned general manager. Charles H. Topmiller had been the chief engineer of WCKY and planned to resign from that station to head up the new WZIP, but he was instead offered the post of manager at WCKY.

WZIP began broadcasting .  It was a 250-watt daytimer, required to go off the air at sunset.  WZIP was the first radio station to operate from northern Kentucky since WCKY had moved across the Ohio River to Cincinnati in 1939.  WZIP operated from studios on the fourth floor of the former Peoples Savings Bank Building in downtown Covington, where WCKY's first broadcasts had been made in 1929. The full-service station was the first in the Cincinnati market to employ a Black disc jockey, Ernie Waites.

Station Sale
At the end of 1957, WZIP, Incorporated, successor to Northern Kentucky Airwaves, filed to sell the station to a corporation controlled by Len Goorian, a longtime television personality in the area, and attorney Alfred B. Katz for $150,000. WZIP, by this point airing a "good music" format, scored a coup when it became the Mutual Broadcasting System network affiliate for the Cincinnati area on July 21, 1958, replacing longtime Mutual outlet and network founder WLW. 

Goorian and Katz filed to increase the station's power to 1,000 watts.  It relocated the executive offices to the Hotel Vernon Manor, across the river in Cincinnati.

Move to Cincinnati

At the end of 1958, Goorian and Katz sold WZIP to a new corporation headed by Ed Skotch, Dan Balsamo, and Monte Fassnacht.  The company was known as Greater Cincinnati Radio. Major changes followed the approval of the purchase in early 1959. 

The station was approved to increase power to 1,000 watts, a filing made by the previous ownership. Following the example of the executive offices, Greater Cincinnati Radio filed to move WZIP's city of license and studios from Covington to Cincinnati, citing a desire to increase its identification with the large Ohio city. The FCC approved the change on April 13, 1960.

Adding an FM station
Just two months after the FCC approved the station's relocation to Cincinnati, Greater Cincinnati Radio was sold to the Lindner brothers—-Carl, Robert and Richard-—for $500,000. The Lindner brothers also owned the United Dairy Farmers convenience store chain and Thriftway Super Markets in the Cincinnati area. The Lindners received a construction permit to build a new FM radio station, WZIP-FM at 92.5 MHz.  The FM station would not sign on the air under their ownership, as WZIP-AM-FM was purchased by the Waukegan News-Sun newspaper in Illinois for $450,000 in 1961. That same year, Mutual affiliation moved from WZIP to WCKY.

The News-Sun built WZIP-FM, which began broadcasting on August 17, 1964, and simulcast WZIP's programming during daylight hours. The next year, WZIP was sold to another out-of-town publishing interest: the Zanesville Publishing Company, publisher of the Zanesville Times-Recorder and owner of radio and television properties in Ohio and West Virginia, for $367,500. Unlike the last several sales of WZIP, this one brought a format change. At the start of 1966, WZIP flipped to country, becoming the Cincinnati area's third station in the format.

New ownership
WZIP changed hands yet again in 1970, when Margareta Sudbrink purchased the stations for $750,000. In February 1971, WZIP-FM became easy listening WWEZ.  The FM station moved to separate studios in Highland Towers, leaving WZIP in Vernon Manor. The country format on AM lasted until October 1, 1971, when the station flipped to urban gospel.  It was the only religious station on the AM band in the area, propelling the station to higher revenue than it had achieved in any prior point in history.

Sudbrink sold off WZIP and identically formatted WTOW in Towson, Maryland, to its executive vice president, Hal Gore, at the end of 1974.  WZIP cost $375,000. The purchase kickstarted a chain of gospel radio stations that had grown to six outlets by 1978. That year, Gore moved WZIP out of the Vernon Manor after a 20-year stay and into new quarters in a former post office building.

WTSJ
In 1980, Hal Gore sold three of his stations—WZIP, WTOW and Toledo's WGOR—to Jaco Broadcasting, a company majority-owned by Jacor, Inc., for $1.5 million. The principal of Jacor, making its first station purchases, was Terry S. Jacobs, senior vice president of Great American Insurance Company. The call sign changed to WTSJ on April 8, 1981. Four years after the purchase, and after the company had begun to buy stations in major markets, Jacor sold WTSJ and WTOW to American Sunrise Communications, a private company specializing in the operation of religious radio stations, for more than $2.4 million. As early as 1986, WTSJ was recognized as having been "the beginning of a major broadcast entity".

American Sunrise sold five of its stations to Guardian Communications, which was owned by two employees of sister station KTSJ in Pomona, California, for $5.6 million in 1990. Guardian was one of the largest contributors to a successful 1993 voter-approved amendment to Cincinnati's city charter that removed discrimination protections for gays and lesbians.

Guardian, with its nine stations in Albuquerque, Baltimore, Cincinnati, Cleveland and Pueblo, Colorado, was put up for auction in 1996 in an event precipitated by one of the 1050 frequency's former owners. Carl Lindner, through Great American Insurance, owned 50 percent of the company at that time.  After cashing out its stake in Citicasters, it opted to sell its stake in Guardian, prompting co-owners Mark McNeil and Richard David to follow suit. Salem Communications filed to purchase the Baltimore, Cleveland and Cincinnati stations for $3 million.  Salem changed the format to Christian talk and teaching.

WCVX and WGRI

Salem held onto WTSJ until 2005, when it traded it and WBOB (1160 AM) to the Christian Broadcasting System in exchange for WLQV in Detroit. Christian Broadcasting System retained the Christian talk format on 1050 but assigned new WCVX call letters.

The WCVX call letters and Christian radio format moved to the stronger 1160 AM signal on February 1, 2013. At that time, 1050 AM flipped to its present urban gospel format and changed call letters to WGRI.

References

External links

GRI
Gospel radio stations in the United States
GRI
1947 establishments in Kentucky
Radio stations established in 1947